Millmont is an unincorporated community in Union County, Pennsylvania, United States. Millmont has a post office with ZIP code 17845.

References

Unincorporated communities in Union County, Pennsylvania
Unincorporated communities in Pennsylvania